The 1977 Paris–Roubaix was the 75th edition of the Paris–Roubaix cycle race and was held on 17 April 1977. The race started in Compiègne and finished in Roubaix. The race was won by Roger De Vlaeminck of the Brooklyn cycling team from Italy.

General classification

References

Paris–Roubaix
Paris-Roubaix
Paris-Roubaix
Paris-Roubaix
Paris-Roubaix